Phù Cát is a district (huyện) of Bình Định province in the South Central Coast region of Vietnam.

The district capital lies at Ngô Mây.

The district is also home to Phu Cat Airport.

References

Districts of Bình Định province